not to be confused with journalist E. Blair Bolles (1912–1990)

Edmund Blair Bolles (born 1942) is an American humanist and author.  Bolles argues that human free will and originality are real and natural, deriving from animal memory systems. He developed this doctrine in three books written in the 1980s.

Bolles is the grandson of Wisconsin congressman Stephen Bolles.

Work 

His major work includes:

 So Much to Say (1980), regarding the language of children from birth to age five. It proposes that children are driven to talk because they have "something to say," have private emotions and thoughts to report.
 Remembering and Forgetting (1986), which opens with the sentence, "Remembering is an act of imagination."   Bolles makes a sharp distinction between computer memory (storage) and human remembering (recreating sensory experiences).
 A Second Way of Knowing (1991), about perception, which Bolles defines as knowing the meaning of what the senses present. The book contrasts the sensory-based knowledge of animal and humans with a view of symbolically based computation available to computers.

References
 "Notable Former Volunteers / Arts and Literature". Peace Corps official site. Accessed 5 January 2007.

External links 

 Bolles' website

American humanists
Living people
Peace Corps volunteers
1942 births